Yendegaia National Park is located in Tierra del Fuego in the Magallanes y la Antártica Chilena Region of Chile and contains  of mountainous terrain and Valdivian temperate rain forest. It borders the Alberto de Agostini National Park and Tierra del Fuego National Park.

Origin

Yendegaia National Park is the result of public-private collaboration between the Government of Chile and the Yendegaia Foundation, a branch of the conservation project run by Douglas and Kris Tompkins.
The park was first conceived in 2011 and was one of many projects created to celebrate the Bicentennial of Chile.
Yendegaia's location on the border of Argentina's Tierra del Fuego National Park has allowed the creation of an International Union for Conservation of Nature trans-border park or “Peace Park”.

Geography

The park is located south of the Azopardo River and stretches from the Darwin Range to the Argentine border and from the Beagle Channel to Fagnago Lake. Yendegaia creates a contiguous ecological corridor between Chile's Alberto de Agostini National Park and Argentina's Tierra del Fuego National Park. The landscape is composed of mountains, glaciers, lakes, canals, rivers and fjords.

Flora and fauna
The new park protects the last remaining sub-Antarctic beech forest, one of Earth's largest remnants of the Gondwana super continent dating back 180 million years ago. Other species that can be found in the park include Lenga (Nothofagus pumilio), Canelo (Drimys winteri) and Coigüe (Nothofagus dombeyi). The area provides an important habitat for three species in danger of extinction (the culpeo, the river otter, and the ruddy-headed geese), and a broad range of native flora and fauna, including 128 vascular plant species and 49 bird species.

Administration and access

The park is administered by the Chilean National Forest Corporation (CONAF). The nearest urban area is the town of Porvenir in Chile, although the Argentinian city of Ushuaia is also nearby. The park can be reached by sea from Puerto Williams, or by road along the Y-85 route south from Porvenir.

Trails
As the park was only founded in December 2013, official trails have not yet been created, but there are many non-official trails with various levels of difficulty starting from both the end of the Y-85 and from Fagnago Lake.

Weather
Classified as subpolar oceanic climate, the weather in this region is variable and often inhospitable with heavy rain and regularly overcast skies. In winter, from June to September, the temperature can drop to 11° Celsius below zero. In summer, temperatures occasionally reach 24° Celsius.

See also
 Alberto de Agostini National Park 
 Alerce Andino National Park
 Alerce Costero National Park  
 Archipiélago de Juan Fernández National Park

References

External links

 Yendegaia National Park, Tomkins Conservation
 Parque Nacional Yendegaia, Gob.cl
  Yendegaia National Park on CONAF website

Tierra del Fuego Province, Chile
Protected areas established in 2013
National parks of Chile
Protected areas of Magallanes Region
Isla Grande de Tierra del Fuego
2013 establishments in Chile
2013 in Chilean law